Danica Jurčová (born 5 August 1976, Bratislava) is a Slovak-Czech actress.

In 1998 she graduated from the Academy of Performing Arts in Bratislava. She performed at the Slovak National Theater in works such as  The Cherry Orchard, As You Like It, Merry Wives of Windsor and Lorenzaccio. At the Divadlo Astorka Korzo '90 theatre she played The Philistine at the New Scene. She also starred in television productions including soap operas. Currently she operates in the Czech Republic.

Selected filmography 
Empties (2007)
360 (2011)

References

External links

1976 births
Living people
Slovak actors
Slovak emigrants to the Czech Republic
Academy of Performing Arts in Bratislava alumni
21st-century Czech actresses
21st-century Slovak actresses